This is a list of episodes for the Japanese anime military science fiction television series Space Battleship Yamato 2199. It is a remake of the first Space Battleship Yamato television series created by Yoshinobu Nishizaki in 1974, known in the United States as Star Blazers. The first episode aired on April 6, 2012, on Family Gekijo channel. The series is being screened back-to-back in theaters across Japan, a few episodes at a time prior to release on home video, and started airing on television on April 7, 2013. The series is confirmed to be marketed internationally under the name Star Blazers.

Episode list

Notes

References

2199